Nina Coolman (born 25 January 1991) is a Belgian female volleyball player. She is a member of the Belgium women's national volleyball team and played for Saint-Cloud Paris in 2014.

She was part of the Belgian national team at the 2014 FIVB Volleyball Women's World Championship in Italy.

Clubs
  Saint-Cloud Paris (2014)

References

External links
  
  
  
  
  

1991 births
Living people
Belgian women's volleyball players
Place of birth missing (living people)
21st-century Belgian women